Andrey Petrov (sometimes listed as Andriy Petrov, born March 29, 1971) is a Ukrainian sprint canoer who competed in the mid-1990s. He won a bronze medal in the K-4 200 m event at the 1994 ICF Canoe Sprint World Championships in Mexico City.

Petrov competed in the K-4 1000 m event at the 1996 Summer Olympics in Atlanta, but was eliminated in the semifinals.

References

Sports-Reference.com profile

1971 births
Canoeists at the 1996 Summer Olympics
Living people
Olympic canoeists of Ukraine
Ukrainian male canoeists
ICF Canoe Sprint World Championships medalists in kayak